Saitis chaperi is a species of spider of the genus Saitis. It is native to India and Sri Lanka.

References

Spiders of the Indian subcontinent
Spiders of Asia
Spiders described in 1885
chaperi